"I'm Your Boogie Man" is a song written and produced by Harry Wayne Casey and Richard Finch, and performed by Casey's band KC and the Sunshine Band, from their fourth album Part 3 (1976).

Background
Richard Finch said that the song was written about a DJ at a Miami, Florida, radio station named Robert W. Walker, who was the first to give their hit single "Get Down Tonight" airplay.

Reception
New York Times critic John Rockwell called the song "another alluring, catchy, sleepily kinetic dance [disc]" and a "perfect summer (or spring, fall or winter) party record."

Record World said that "re-defining their hit formula with a sharp, syncopated beat and sassy vocals, it's poised to go all the way."

Chart performance
In 1977 the song reached the number one position on the Billboard Hot 100 and No. 3 on the soul chart. Billboard ranked it as the #11 song of 1977. The song was also an international hit, reaching number one in Canada and charting in Australia (No. 38), Belgium (No. 16), the Netherlands (No. 6), New Zealand (No. 12), and the United Kingdom (No. 41).

Charts

Weekly charts

Year-end charts

Certifications

White Zombie version

American band White Zombie originally recorded a cover of "I'm Your Boogie Man" for The Crow: City of Angels Soundtrack. However, since the song's release date, it has also appeared on Rob Zombie's greatest hits album Past, Present & Future and as a remixed version on the EP Supersexy Swingin' Sounds.

The audio samples in the song where children are heard saying "He's gonna get you! The Boogieman is coming!" are taken from the 1978 film Halloween, which would later be remade in 2007 by Rob Zombie. The remixed version was also heard on a Halloween episode of the ABC television series 666 Park Avenue.

Reception
The song earned White Zombie their third and final Grammy nomination for Best Metal Performance in 1997. Stephen Thomas Erlewine of AllMusic called the cover "embarrassingly predictable, humorless, and clueless."

Track listing

See also
List of Billboard Hot 100 number-one singles of 1977
List of Cash Box Top 100 number-one singles of 1977
List of number-one singles of 1977 (Canada)
List of RPM number-one dance singles of 1976

References

External links

1976 songs
1976 singles
1996 singles
Billboard Hot 100 number-one singles
Cashbox number-one singles
KC and the Sunshine Band songs
RPM Top Singles number-one singles
Songs written by Harry Wayne Casey
Songs written by Richard Finch (musician)
White Zombie (band) songs
Songs about dancing
TK Records singles
Hollywood Records singles